Serine/threonine-protein kinase 3 is an enzyme that in humans is encoded by the STK3 gene.

Background 
Protein kinase activation is a frequent response of cells to treatment with growth factors, chemicals, heat shock, or apoptosis-inducing agents. This protein kinase activation presumably allows cells to resist unfavorable environmental conditions. The yeast 'sterile 20' (Ste20) kinase acts upstream of the mitogen-activated protein kinase (MAPK) cascade that is activated under a variety of stress conditions. MST2 was first identified as a kinase that resembles budding yeast Ste20 (Creasy and Chernoff, 1996) and later as a kinase that is activated by the proapoptotic agents straurosporine and FAS ligand (MIM 134638) (Taylor et al., 1996; Lee et al., 2001).[supplied by OMIM]

Structure 
Human serine/threonine-protein kinase 3 (STK3, or MST2) is a 56,301 Da monomer with three domains: a SARAH domain, composed of a long α-helix at the C-terminus that when dimerized, forms an antiparallel dimeric coiled-coil, an inhibitory domain, and a catalytic kinase domain at the N-terminus. The SARAH (Salvador/RASSF/Hpo) domain has been found to mediate dimeric interactions between MST2 and RASSF enzymes, a class of tumor suppressors that serve an important role in activating apoptosis, as well as between MST2 and SAV1, a non-catalytic polypeptide responsible for bringing MST2 to an apoptotic pathway. When the MST2 kinase domain is in its active state, a threonine residue residing on an alpha helix at the 180th position (T180) is autophosphorylated.

Mechanism

Activation
STK3 is activated through autophosphorylation by dimerizing with itself or heterodimerizing with its homolog, MST1 (STK4). Heterodimerization has been shown to exhibit a roughly six-fold weaker binding affinity than homodimerization with MST2, as well as lower kinase activity compared to both MST2/MST2 and MST1/MST1 homodimers. In addition to activation by straurosporine and FAS ligand, STK3 has been found to be activated through dissociation of GLRX and Thioredoxin (Trx1) from STK3 under oxidative stress. Recent studies have shown that when caspase 3 is activated during apoptosis, MST2 is cleaved, resulting in removal of the regulatory SARAH and inhibitory domains and thus regulation of MST2's kinase activity. Because cleavage by caspase 3 also cleaves off MST2's nuclear export signal, the MST2 kinase fragment can diffuse into the nucleus and phosphorylate Ser14 of histone H2B, promoting apoptosis.

Inactivation
Inactivation of MST2 can be accomplished in several ways, including inhibition of MST2 homodimerization and autophosphorylation by c-Raf, which binds to the MST2 SARAH domain, and phosphorylation of the highly conserved Thr117 by Akt (protein kinase B), blocking autophosphorylation of Thr180, MST2 cleavage, kinase activity, and translocation to the nucleus.

MST2 substrates
In the mammalian Hippo signaling pathway, MST2, along with its homolog MST1, serves as an upstream kinase whose catalytic activity is responsible for downstream events leading to downregulation of proliferation-associated genes and increased transcription of proapoptotic genes. When MST2 binds to SAV1 through its SARAH domain, MST2 phosphorylates LATS1/LATS2 with the help of SAV1, MOB1A/MOB1B, and Merlin (protein). In turn, LATS1/LATS2 phosphorylates and inhibits YAP1, preventing its movement into the nucleus and activation of transcription of pro-proliferative, anti-apoptotic and migration-associated genes. In the cytoplasm, YAP1 is marked for degradation by the SCF complex. Additionally, MST2 phosphorylates transcription factors in the FOXO (Forkhead box O) family, which diffuse into the nucleus and activate transcription of pro-apoptotic genes.

Disease Relevance
In many types of cancers, the proto-oncogene c-Raf binds to the SARAH domain of MST2 and prevents RASSF1A-mediated MST2 dimerization and subsequent downstream pro-apoptotic signaling. Research has shown that in cells with loss of PTEN (gene), a tumor suppressor that is frequently mutated in cancers, Akt activity is upregulated, resulting in increased MST2 inactivation and undesirable cell proliferation.

References

Further reading

External links